"What Becomes of the Brokenhearted" is a hit single recorded by Jimmy Ruffin and released on Motown Records' Soul label in the summer of 1966. It is a ballad, with lead singer Jimmy Ruffin recalling the pain that befalls the broken-hearted who had love that's now departed. The song essentially deals with the struggle to overcome sadness while seeking a new relationship after a breakup.

The tune was written by William Weatherspoon, Paul Riser, and James Dean, and the recording was produced by Weatherspoon and William "Mickey" Stevenson. "What Becomes of the Brokenhearted" remains one of the most-revived of Motown's hits.

Composers Weatherspoon and Riser and lyricist Dean had originally written "What Becomes of the Brokenhearted" with the intention of having the Spinners, then an act on Motown's V.I.P. label, record it. Jimmy Ruffin, older brother of Temptations lead singer David Ruffin, persuaded Dean to let him do the tune, as its anguished lyric about a man lost in the misery of heartbreak resonated with the singer.

Ruffin's lead vocal is augmented by the instrumentation of Motown's in-house studio band, the Funk Brothers, and the joint backing vocals of Motown session singers the Originals and the Andantes. "What Becomes of the Brokenhearted" peaked at No. 7 on the Billboard Hot 100, and at No. 6 on the Billboard R&B Singles chart, as well as No. 8 on the UK Chart. Eight years later, the song was reissued (with a B-side of Ruffin's minor US hit "Don't You Miss Me a Little Bit Baby"), and surpassed its original chart position, reaching No. 4, and thus making it his highest-placed chart single in the UK.

The song originally featured a spoken introduction by Ruffin, similar in style to many of Lou Rawls' performances at the time. The spoken verse was removed from the final mix, hence the unusually long instrumental intro on the released version. The spoken verse is present on the alternative mix from the UK 2003 release Jimmy Ruffin - The Ultimate Motown Collection, and as a new stereo extended mix on the 2005 anthology, The Motown Box:

A world filled with love is a wonderful sight.
Being in love is one's heart's delight.
But that look of love isn't on my face.
That enchanted feeling has been replaced.

Charts

Weekly charts
{| class="wikitable sortable"
|-
!align="left"|Chart (1966)
!align="left"|Peakposition
|-
|align="left"|Canada RPM Top Singles
| style="text-align:center;"|18
|-
|align="left"|France 
| style="text-align:center;"|2
|-
|align="left"|UK Singles Chart
| style="text-align:center;"|8
|-
|align="left"|US Billboard Hot 100
| style="text-align:center;"|7
|-
|align="left"|US Billboard R&B
| style="text-align:center;"|6
|-
|align="left"|US Cash Box Top 100 
| style="text-align:center;"|9
|-
|align="left"|US Record World 
| style="text-align:center;"|7
|-
|}

Year-end charts

Certifications

Personnel
 Lead vocals by Jimmy Ruffin
 Background vocals by the Originals (Freddie Gorman, Walter Gaines, Hank Dixon, C.P. Spencer) and the Andantes (Jackie Hicks, Marlene Barrow, Louvain Demps)
 Instrumentation by the Funk Brothers
 String arrangements by Paul Riser

Licensed uses
Film and television
In 1990, the song was used in The Wonder Years Season 3 Episode "The St. Valentine's Day Massacre" where Kevin Arnold picks up a Valentine's Day card meant for Winnie Cooper realizing he has genuine feelings for her.

In 2009, the song was used during the closing credits of the French film "La Famille Wolberg".

In 2019 HBO's "Big Little Lies", used the song in the first episode of the second season.

In 2019 Apple TV+’s For All Mankind, used the song during the first episode of the first season.

Paul Young version

A 1991 cover by Paul Young was featured in the film Fried Green Tomatoes. During the winter of 1992, his version reached No. 22 on the US Billboard Hot 100 and No. 8 Cash Box, becoming Young's third No. 1 song on the US adult contemporary chart (following "Everytime You Go Away" and "Oh Girl").  It was a bigger hit in Canada, reaching No. 6 pop and No. 1 Adult Contemporary.

Chart history

Weekly charts

Year-end charts

Other covers

A 1980 rendition by Dave Stewart on synth and vocals by Zombies singer Colin Blunstone on Stiff. It reached No. 13 in the UK. A 1996 cover version by Robson & Jerome spent two weeks at number-one in the UK Singles Chart.

Westlife also covered the song. It was released as the B-side of the single "What Makes a Man" in December 2000.

Joan Osborne recorded the song with the Funk Brothers for the soundtrack of the 2002 film Standing in the Shadows of the Motown. The track also appeared on Osborne's 2007 album Breakfast in Bed.

Bruce Springsteen recorded the song for his 2022 album, Only the Strong Survive.

References

Ritz, David (1992). "Jimmy Ruffin". Liner notes from Hitsville USA: The Motown Singles Collection: 1959 - 1971''. Motown Record Company, L.P./PolyGram.

External links
 
 
 
 
 List of cover versions of "What Becomes of the Brokenhearted" at SecondHandSongs.com

1966 songs
1966 singles
1981 singles
1992 singles
1996 singles
Jimmy Ruffin songs
Dave Stewart (keyboardist) songs
Paul Young songs
Robson & Jerome songs
Motown singles
MCA Records singles
RCA Records singles
UK Singles Chart number-one singles
Number-one singles in Scotland
Song recordings produced by William "Mickey" Stevenson
Songs written by James Dean (songwriter)
1960s ballads
Songs about heartache
Soul ballads